Banoti waterfall is a remote and desolate location off the village of Banoti in the Soegaon taluka of the Aurangabad district in the Maharashtra state of India. This waterfall is least known in spite of being quite picturesque and enchanting. Access to the place is difficult without involving a long trek from the nearest village of Banoti.

The importance of the waterfall is linked to archaeology and Buddhism, since there is an ancient Buddhist monastery of the fifth century CE. The monastery (or its remains) is not accessible (except with the help of a climbing rope). The existence of such an ancient monastery adjacent to the Banoti waterfall is largely unknown to the modern world except for some references in archaeological works. It was, indeed, this waterfall that cradled the ancient Buddhist monastery of Banoti, which was contemporary to the Ajanta cave temples.

The waterfall, however, is not large, its optical width being nearly 20 ft and elevation nearly 200 ft. It is a seasonal waterfall that runs during monsoon season.

Facts

Relative location and approach 
 Nearest habitation or human settlement: Banoti village (nearly 20 km trek)
 Nearest possible camp: Fardapur (via Soegaon: 48 km)
 Nearest district headquarters/ city: Jalgaon and Aurangabad
 Nearest serviced airport: Aurangabad, Maharashtra (148 km)

Other location and approach 
 Amruteshwar (Lord shiva) temple via banoti chaufuli 1 km.
 Lord shanidev temple via banoti chaufuli 1 km.
 Lord ganesha temple MSEB, Banoti.
 Naygaon ford Via banoti- Naygaon  4 km.

Major rail heads 
 Jalgaon, Maharashtra (108 km via Fardapur; 73 km via Pachora)
 Bhusawal (97 km via Pachora and Jalgaon; 105 km via Fardapur and Jamner)
 Aurangabad (116 km via Kannad)
 Pachora (19 km via Gondegaon)
 Chalisgaon (43 km via Nagad)

References

External links 
 Searching for the Banoti Waterfall--A Place Happily Secluded from the Humans

See also
List of waterfalls of India

Waterfalls of Maharashtra
Tourist attractions in Aurangabad district, Maharashtra